Indubhai Bhailal Amin (born 19 August 1915, date of death unknown) was an Indian politician. He was elected to the Lok Sabha, the lower house of the Parliament of India, as a member of the Independent. Amin is deceased.

References

External links
Official biographical sketch in Parliament of India website

1915 births
Year of death missing
India MPs 1952–1957
Lok Sabha members from Gujarat